Bruce Harry Bellas (July 7, 1909 – July 1974) was an American photographer. He was influential in his work with male physiques and nudes. Bellas was well known under the pseudonym Bruce of Los Angeles.

History and influence
Bruce Harry Bellas was born in Alliance, Nebraska on July 7, 1909. He worked as a chemistry teacher there until 1947, when he began photographing bodybuilders in Los Angeles, California, beginning with taking pictures of bodybuilding competitions. In 1956, Bellas launched his own magazine, The Male Figure. Among physique photographers, Bellas' work was noted for having a distinctly campy, tongue-in-cheek sensibility. Bellas also produced a number of early homoerotic 8 mm films with titles such as Cowboy Washup and Big Gun for Hire.

Bellas was known to travel around the country, finding new models to photograph and also personally delivering nude photographs to customers, since they were liable to be seized by postal inspectors if sent through the mail.

An extensive archive of Bellas' nude male physique photographs exists today, largely intact.  His impact on physique photography is largely felt and recognized, and the works of Robert Mapplethorpe, Herb Ritts, and Bruce Weber are widely considered to be influenced by Bellas' pioneering style. In 1990, the Wessel O'Connor Gallery in New York and the Jan Kesner Gallery in Los Angeles both exhibited a wide array of Bellas' work, furthering modern recognition of his impact.

Bellas died while on vacation in Canada in July 1974. He was buried at [[Forest Lawn Memorial Park (Hollywood Hills)
|Forest Lawn Memorial Park]] in the Hollywood Hills on August 9. Bellas was in a long-term relationship with favorite model Scotty Cunningham, to whom he left his estate.

References

External links
Bruce Bellas Biography
Bruce Bellas Photography

1909 births
1974 deaths
20th-century American photographers
People from Alliance, Nebraska
Physique photography